Chain of Events is a 1958 British crime film directed by Gerald Thomas based on a radio play by Leo McKern. It features Susan Shaw, Dermot Walsh, Jack Watling, Freddie Mills and Joan Hickson.

Plot
A London bank clerk (also called Clark) evades the gaze of a busy bus conductor to avoid paying his bus fare, as he doesn't have the right fare. However, a bus inspector gets on and challenges him. He claims he had a ticket and that the conductor is lying. He is asked for his name and address. It turns into a formal complaint. He gives his name as John Stockman, one of his acquaintances whose address he knows.

Next we see the real John Stockman in court. It appears that the conductor and inspector think it is the same man. Stockman justifiably denies it and is very rude about the witnesses. He is fined £5, but the case gets in the local newspaper.

We next see Stockman in the bank and Clark serving him, explaining how he knew the name and address. However, the reporter (Tom Quinn) is dragged in front of his editor as Stockman is an investor in the  paper and is furious. Quinn is fired for not checking the story which is now going to retrial as Stockman has an alibi.
Quinn goes to a bar to drown his sorrows. He is joined by Jill. In his drunk state he starts blurting out other stories, including Lord Fenchurch's affair. But other reporters are at the bar and Freddie overhears this gossip.

Meanwhile Clark goes to board his usual bus and is too embarrassed to get on when he sees the same conductor. He takes the train home instead and is late. He tells his wife that he will take the train in future as the bus is too crowded.

Freddie takes his acquired knowledge to a contact, Becket. They discuss blackmailing Lord Fenchurch.

Lord Fenchurch (the owner of Quinn's newspaper) discusses Lady Fenchurch's ill health with his secretary. He receives a blackmailing phone call asking for £2000. Lord Fenchurch confides to Jill his secretary that it is true and he has a lover called Simone. Jo is sent to see her. She is instructed to offer Simone money to deny all knowledge of the affair. During this visit Jimmy Boy arrives, and seems to be another boyfriend. Jimmy Boy calls his friend Tiny to sort out the blackmailer.

Outside a post office Freddie and the blackmailer watch for Lord Fenchurch, He arrives and takes an envelope into the post office. They go in and collect the £2000. They discuss asking for more, but they cannot wait too long in case Lady Fenchurch dies as that would remove the motive for Lord Fenchurch to pay up.

Tom Quinn gets a new job at the paper - writing obituaries. Back in the bar Freddie settles his bar tab with his new-found wealth and buys Quinn a drink.

Clark starts becoming late for work, blemishing his perfect record.

Quinn decides to investigate Freddie's sudden wealth.

Becket calls Fenchurch for a second £2000. He tells Jill to phone Simone. Simone phones Jimmy Boy to set up an ambush with Tiny. Quinn watches events unfold as the money is dropped and Becket retrieves it as Tiny punches Freddie. Jimmy Boy jumps in the back of the car instead of Freddie. The car drives off pursued by Quinn. The car crashes trying to avoid hitting Clark. But Clark, Jimmy Boy and Becket are killed.

Quinn returns the £2000 to Fenchurch.
.

Cast
 Susan Shaw - Jill
 Dermot Walsh - Tom Quinn
 Jack Watling - Freddie
 Alan Gifford - Lord Fenchurch
 Harold Lang - Jimmy Boy
 Lisa Gastoni - Simone Day
 Kenneth Griffith - Clarke
 Ballard Berkeley - John Stockman
 Frank Forsythe - Johnson a bank clerk
 Cyril Chamberlain - Bus Conductor
 Freddie Mills - Tiny
 Martin Boddey - Bus Inspector
 Anthony Sagar - The Drunk
 Myrtle Reed - Mrs Clarke 
 Martin Wyldeck - Becket
 James Raglan - Magistrate
 Joan Hickson - Barmaid
 John Stuart - Bank Manager

Critical reception
TV Guide wrote, "from a radio play written by talented British [sic] actor Leo McKern, but that's not sufficient reason to sit through it" ; whereas Cinemaretro wrote, "very much a B movie feature, the film stands firmly, and really works exceptionally well on its own merits."

References

External links

1958 films
British crime films
British black-and-white films
1950s English-language films
Films produced by Peter Rogers
Films directed by Gerald Thomas
1950s British films